The Nanaimo Buccaneers are a junior 'B' ice hockey team based in Nanaimo, British Columbia. The original Buccaneers were founded and owned by Cliff McNabb, who had also founded the Nanaimo Clippers, and Jimmy Dawes in 1966-67. They play in the North Division of the Vancouver Island Junior Hockey League. They were one of two expansion teams in 2012 in the VIJHL returning to the league after 30+ years  (the other being the Westshore Wolves), and play their home games at the Nanaimo Ice Centre (Rink #1).

History

The current Buccaneers franchise was founded as an expansion team in 2012 along with the Westshore Wolves by Brenda and Phil Levesque. However there was a former Buccaneers franchise founded by Cliff McNabb that operated in the 1960’s. They finished first in the North Division in their first season (2012–13) with 58 points in 48 games, losing in the second round of the playoffs. The following year they finished third in the division, losing in the first round. They finished third again in 2014-15, and lost again in the first round.

Season-by-season record
Note: GP - Games Played, W - Wins, L - Losses, T - Ties, OTL - Overtime Losses, Pts - Points, GF - Goals for, GA - Goals against

Accurate as of 19 February 2018.

Playoffs

Accurate as of 29 April 2018.

References

External links
Official website of the Nanaimo Buccaneers

Ice hockey teams in British Columbia
Sport in Nanaimo
2012 establishments in British Columbia
Ice hockey clubs established in 2012